Mario Benítez may refer to:

 Mario Benítez (footballer) (born 1983), Colombian footballer 
 Mario Benítez (boxer) (born 1946), Uruguayan boxer
 Mario Abdo Benítez (born 1971), President of Paraguay